Matías Federico Saaad (born June 16, 1980 in Santa Fe) is an Argentine professional footballer. He currently plays for Quintanar del Rey in Spain.

Previously, he played on the professional level in the Argentina Primera División for Unión de Santa Fe, Nueva Chicago and All Boys.

References

External links
 Argentine Primera statistics at Fútbol XXI 

1980 births
Living people
Argentine people of Arab descent
Argentine footballers
Argentine expatriate footballers
Expatriate footballers in Switzerland
Expatriate footballers in Spain
Unión de Santa Fe footballers
FC Lugano players
Nueva Chicago footballers
Tiro Federal footballers
Comisión de Actividades Infantiles footballers
San Martín de Tucumán footballers
Instituto footballers
Club Almagro players
Pontevedra CF footballers
All Boys footballers
Argentine Primera División players
Argentine expatriate sportspeople in Spain
Association football forwards
La Roda CF players
Lucena CF players
Footballers from Santa Fe, Argentina